Face of the Enemy may refer to:

Literature
 The Face of the Enemy (Doctor Who), a novel based on Doctor Who

Television
 "Face of the Enemy" (TNG episode), an episode of Star Trek:The Next Generation
 "The Face of the Enemy" (Babylon 5), an episode of Babylon 5
 Battlestar Galactica: The Face of the Enemy, a series of Battlestar Galactica webisodes